Dendi Santoso (born in  Malang, East Java, 16 May 1990) is an Indonesian professional footballer who plays as a winger for Liga 1 club Arema.

International career
He made his debut for the Indonesia in the 2022 FIFA World Cup qualification against United Arab Emirates on 10 October 2019.

Career statistics

Club

International appearances

International goals
Dendi Santoso: International under-23 goals

Honours

Club 
Arema
Indonesia Super League: 2009–10
Menpora Cup: 2013
Indonesian Inter Island Cup: 2014/15
Indonesia President's Cup: 2017, 2019, 2022

International 
Indonesia U23
 Southeast Asian Games  Silver medal: 2013

References

External links 
 Dendi Santoso at Liga Indonesia
 

1990 births
Living people
People from Malang
Sportspeople from East Java
Indonesian footballers
Arema F.C. players
Liga 1 (Indonesia) players
Indonesian Premier League players
Indonesia youth international footballers
Indonesia international footballers
Association football wingers
Association football forwards
Southeast Asian Games silver medalists for Indonesia
Southeast Asian Games medalists in football
Competitors at the 2013 Southeast Asian Games